Marco Crugnola and Daniele Giorgini were the defending champions, but decided not to compete.

Guillermo Durán and Máximo González won the title, defeating James Cerretani and Frank Moser in the final, 6–3, 6–3.

Seeds

Draw

Draw

References
 Main Draw

Aspria Tennis Cup - Trofeo CDI - Doubles
2014 - Doubles